HLA-B15 (B15) is an HLA-B serotype. The serotype identifies the B*15 gene-allele protein products of HLA-B.

B15 is a broad antigen can be subdivided into several split antigens that are often used in characterization. These are B62, B63, B70, B71, B72, B75, B76, B77. B*15 is the largest allele grouping for any known human autosomal locus, identified as of August 2008 there are more than 150 alleles and ~140 amino acid sequence variants from those gene products. Some of these alleles are discussed below. Other alleles, such as B*46 evolved from B*15. One reason for the diversity of this group is that B15 is among a group of alleles enriched in the original humans that left Africa and dispersed across East Asia and Australia. As people traveled east the frequency of many alleles dropped or disappeared from migrants. However B*15 persisted, expanded and diversified. The wide range and complex environment selected for new alleles and promoted their expansion. B*46 for example is not found in Africa, and appears to have evolved and spread in East Asia, to several 100 million bearers worldwide.

HLA-B15 allele *15:02 is associated with the severe skin conditions Stevens–Johnson syndrome (SJS) and toxic epidermal necrolysis (TEN) caused by carbamazepine drug sensitivity in East Asians.

Serotype

References

1
Drug-sensitivity genes